Ángel Román Martínez (born July 11, 1984) is a Puerto Rican taekwondo practitioner and mathematician. Roman represented Puerto Rico at the 2008 Summer Olympics in Beijing, where he competed for the men's 80 kg class. He lost the first preliminary match to Canada's Sébastien Michaud, with a sudden death score of 1–2.

References

External links

NBC 2008 Olympics profile

Puerto Rican male taekwondo practitioners
1984 births
Living people
Olympic taekwondo practitioners of Puerto Rico
Taekwondo practitioners at the 2008 Summer Olympics
21st-century Puerto Rican people